Ononis viscosa is a species of annual herb in the family Fabaceae. They have a self-supporting growth form and broad leaves. Individuals can grow to 0.18 m.

Sources

References 

viscosa